"The Nose Job" is the 26th episode of Seinfeld. It is the ninth episode of the show's third season. It first aired on November 20, 1991. The episode was written by Peter Mehlman and was directed by Tom Cherones.

Plot
Kramer wants a jacket belonging to his mother's ex-boyfriend, as it supposedly has an attractive power over women. To get the jacket, he asks Elaine to impersonate the daughter of the owner.

George thinks his girlfriend Audrey is perfect, except for one flaw: she has a large nose. During a conversation about beautiful women, Kramer bluntly tells her she needs a nose job. In outrage, Elaine refuses to help him with the jacket. Eager to see his girlfriend's one flaw corrected but afraid of appearing shallow, George first ascertains that Audrey was not offended by Kramer's suggestion and then delicately persuades her to get the nose job. The surgery is horrifically botched, and an appointment is made to fix the damage. George is so nauseated by her disfigured nose that he cannot look at her, and tries to lead her into taking a vacation by herself in the interim between surgeries. Audrey breaks up with him in response.

Jerry is conflicted about his relationship with an actress named Isabel, whom he finds sexually attractive, but dumb and irritating. He likens the conflict to a chess match between his brain and his penis. When she has him do a practice reading with her, delivering a scenery-chewing performance, Jerry decides he can endure no more and breaks up with her.

After Kramer takes Audrey to the hospital, Elaine relents and goes with him to get the jacket. They fool the landlord and he gives them the jacket, but he inadvertently upsets Kramer when he insults Kramer's mother and Kramer attacks him. Audrey's nose is fixed, making her overall appearance radiantly beautiful. Kramer is seen with the jacket and goes out with Audrey.

References

External links 
 

Seinfeld (season 3) episodes
1991 American television episodes